Saskatoon—Humboldt was a federal electoral district in Saskatchewan, Canada, that was represented in the House of Commons of Canada from 1968 to 1979, and from 1988 to 2015.

Geography

The riding consisted of the northeastern quadrant of Saskatoon and the city of Humboldt and the rural towns of Naicam, Wakaw and Watson. The riding extended to Quill Lake in the east, Pleasantdale in the northeast and St. Louis in the north.

History
This electoral district was first created in 1966 from Humboldt—Melfort, Rosthern (electoral district) and Saskatoon ridings.

It was abolished in 1976 and divided amongst Humboldt—Lake Centre, Prince Albert and Saskatoon East ridings. It was re-created in 1987 from Humboldt—Lake Centre, Prince Albert and Saskatoon East ridings.

It was abolished in 2013.  Most of the Saskatoon portion became part of Saskatoon—University, with a smaller portion going to Saskatoon—Grasswood.  The rural portion was split between Carlton Trail—Eagle Creek, Yorkton—Melville and Moose Jaw—Lake Centre—Lanigan.

Members of Parliament

This riding has elected the following members of the House of Commons:

Political geography

Once a safe Liberal seat, the NDP took over the new creation in 1988. The Liberals stole it back in 1993, but the Reform party and its successor the Canadian Alliance took it over with a strong win in 2000. However, the riding remained split three ways between the Liberals, the new Conservative Party and the NDP. In 2004, with the incumbent, Jim Pankiw running as an independent on the ticket made for the closest four-way race in the country with the winning party receiving just 26.7% of the vote just 4.5 points ahead of the fourth place finisher.

Election results

1988–2011

1968–1979

See also
 List of Canadian federal electoral districts
 Past Canadian electoral districts

References
 
 
 
 Expenditures – 2008
 Expenditures – 2004
 Expenditures – 2000
 Expenditures – 1997

Notes

External links
 Website of the Parliament of Canada
 Map of Saskatoon—Humboldt riding archived by Elections Canada

Humboldt, Saskatchewan
Politics of Saskatoon
Former federal electoral districts of Saskatchewan